United Nations Security Council Resolution 1978, adopted unanimously on April 27, 2011, after recalling all previous resolutions on the situation in Sudan, the Council extended the mandate of the United Nations Mission in Sudan (UNMIS) until July 9, 2011 and announced its intention to create a successor mission.

Observations
The Council considered the results of the independence referendum held in South Sudan in January 2011 and the government's request for a continued United Nations presence there. At the same time, it also determined the situation to remain a threat to international peace and security in the region.

Acts
The mandate of UNMIS, as set out in Resolution 1590 (2005), was extended until July 9, 2011 (the day South Sudan would become independent).  The Council announced its intention to establish a successor mission, and requested the Secretary-General Ban Ki-moon to consult with parties to the Comprehensive Peace Agreement on the matter and report by May 16, 2011.

Finally, UNMIS was requested to prepare for the establishment of the follow-on mission.

See also
 African Union – United Nations Hybrid Operation in Darfur
 List of United Nations Security Council Resolutions 1901 to 2000 (2009–2011)
 Second Sudanese Civil War
 War in Darfur

References

External links
 
Text of the Resolution at undocs.org

 1978
2011 in Sudan
 1978
April 2011 events